Károly Buzás (born 26 February 1945) is a Hungarian wrestler. He competed in the men's freestyle 70 kg at the 1968 Summer Olympics.

References

External links
 

1945 births
Living people
Hungarian male sport wrestlers
Olympic wrestlers of Hungary
Wrestlers at the 1968 Summer Olympics
People from Monor
Sportspeople from Pest County